The 14th Texas Infantry Regiment was a unit of volunteers recruited in Texas that fought in the Confederate States Army during the American Civil War. The regiment organized in the summer of 1862 and spent its entire existence west of the Mississippi River in the Trans-Mississippi Department. The unit was assigned to the 2nd Brigade of the Texas infantry division known as Walker's Greyhounds. The regiment fought at Milliken's Bend in 1863 and Mansfield, Pleasant Hill, and Jenkins' Ferry in 1864. The regiment's formal surrender date was 26 May 1865, but it had already disbanded in mid-May 1865.

References

 

Units and formations of the Confederate States Army from Texas
1862 establishments in Texas
Military units and formations established in 1862
1865 disestablishments in Texas
Military units and formations disestablished in 1865